Caloria elegans is a species of colorful sea slug, an aeolid nudibranch, a marine gastropod mollusc in the family Facelinidae.

Taxonomy
Facelina quatrefagesi was considered as a synonym of Caloria elegans, but it is morphologically very similar and different valid species.

Description
The size of the body varies between 20 mm and 35 mm.

Distribution
This marine species occurs in European waters from the British Isles to the Mediterranean Sea; also off the Canary Islands, the Azores and Madeira.

References

 Alder J. & Hancock A., 1845: Notice of a new genus and several new species of nudibranchiate Mollusca; Annals and Magazine of Natural History 16: 311-316
 Gofas, S.; Le Renard, J.; Bouchet, P. (2001). Mollusca. in: Costello, M.J. et al. (Ed.) (2001). European register of marine species: a check-list of the marine species in Europe and a bibliography of guides to their identification. Collection Patrimoines Naturels. 50: pp. 180–213.

External links
 

Facelinidae
Gastropods described in 1845